This is a list of 131 species in Heterospilus, a genus of braconid wasps in the family Braconidae.

Heterospilus species

 Heterospilus aciculatus (Provancher, 1888) c g
 Heterospilus alboapicalis Belokobylskij, 1994 c g
 Heterospilus alternicoloratus  g
 Heterospilus annulatus Marsh, 1982 c g
 Heterospilus annulicornis (Ashmead, 1894) c g
 Heterospilus anobiidivorus Muesebeck, 1939 c g
 Heterospilus anthaxiae (Ashmead, 1893) c g
 Heterospilus appalachicola (Viereck, 1905) c g
 Heterospilus arleiophagus Marsh & Melo, 1999 c g
 Heterospilus ater Fischer, 1960 c g
 Heterospilus atratus (Ashmead, 1890) c g
 Heterospilus atriceps (Ashmead, 1893) c g
 Heterospilus baeticatus (Provancher, 1880) c g
 Heterospilus balicyba  g
 Heterospilus boliviensis Szepligeti, 1906 c g
 Heterospilus brachyptera (Jakimavicius, 1968) c g
 Heterospilus brasilophagus Marsh & Melo, 1999 c g
 Heterospilus breviatus Shi, Yang & Chen, 2002 c g
 Heterospilus brevicornalus Shi & Chen, 2004 c g
 Heterospilus bruchi Viereck, 1910 c g
 Heterospilus caesus (Nees, 1834) c g
 Heterospilus cancellatus Shi, 2002 c g
 Heterospilus caophongensis Belokobylskij, 1994 c g
 Heterospilus ceballosi (Docavo Alberti, 1960) c g
 Heterospilus cephi Rohwer, 1925 c g
 Heterospilus chinensis Chen & Shi, 2004 c g
 Heterospilus chittendenii (Ashmead, 1893) c g
 Heterospilus chui  g
 Heterospilus concolor (Szepligeti, 1906) c g
 Heterospilus consimilis (Ashmead, 1893) c g
 Heterospilus corsicus (Marshall, 1888) c g
 Heterospilus curvisulcus  g
 Heterospilus densistriatus  g
 Heterospilus discolor (Cresson, 1865) c g
 Heterospilus divisus (Wollaston, 1858) c g
 Heterospilus dubitatus Brues, 1912 c g
 Heterospilus etiellae Rohwer, 1925 c g
 Heterospilus eurostae Viereck, 1917 c g b
 Heterospilus extasus Papp, 1987 c g
 Heterospilus fasciatus Ashmead, 1894 c g
 Heterospilus fasciiventris Brues, 1912 c g
 Heterospilus faustinus Marsh, 1982 c g
 Heterospilus ferruginus Ashmead, 1894 c g
 Heterospilus fischeri Belokobylskij, 1983 c g
 Heterospilus flaviceps (Marshall, 1897) c g
 Heterospilus flavicollis (Ashmead, 1893) c g
 Heterospilus flavipes (Cameron, 1905) c g
 Heterospilus floridanus (Ashmead, 1893) c
 Heterospilus frommeri Marsh, 1989 c g
 Heterospilus fujianensis  g
 Heterospilus fuscexilis Shaw, 1997 c g
 Heterospilus fuscinervis (Cameron, 1887) c g
 Heterospilus genalis Tobias, 1976 c g
 Heterospilus gossypii Muesebeck, 1937 c g
 Heterospilus gracilis Shi & Chen, 2004 c g
 Heterospilus hambletoni Muesebeck, 1937 c g
 Heterospilus hemipterus (Thomson, 1892) c g
 Heterospilus hemitestaceus Belokobylskij, 1996 c g
 Heterospilus humeralis Ashmead, 1894 c g
 Heterospilus hylotrupidis (Ashmead, 1893) c g
 Heterospilus indigenus Belokobylskij, 1983 c g
 Heterospilus jianfengensis  g
 Heterospilus joni Marsh, 1982 c g
 Heterospilus kerzhneri Belokobylskij & Maeto, 2009 g
 Heterospilus koebelei (Ashmead, 1893) c g
 Heterospilus languriae (Ashmead, 1893) c g
 Heterospilus leptosoma Fischer, 1960 c g
 Heterospilus leptostyli Rohwer, 1913 c
 Heterospilus liopodis (Brues, 1910) c g
 Heterospilus liui  g
 Heterospilus longicaudus (Ashmead, 1893) c
 Heterospilus longiventrius  g
 Heterospilus luculentus (Belokobylskij, 1992) c g
 Heterospilus luridostigmus Marsh, 2002 c g
 Heterospilus marchi (Docavo Alberti, 1960) c g
 Heterospilus matthewsi Marsh & Melo, 1999 c g
 Heterospilus megalopus Marsh, 1982 c g
 Heterospilus melanocephalus Rohwer, 1925 c g
 Heterospilus melleus (Ashmead, 1893) c
 Heterospilus meridionalis Brues, 1912 c g
 Heterospilus micronesianus Belokobylskij & Maeto, 2008 c g
 Heterospilus microstigmi Richards, 1935 c g
 Heterospilus minimus Fischer, 1960 c g
 Heterospilus mordellistenae Viereck, 1911 c g
 Heterospilus nanlingensis  g
 Heterospilus niger (Szepligeti, 1906) c
 Heterospilus nigrescens Ashmead, 1894 c g
 Heterospilus nishijimus Belokobylskij & Maeto, 2008 c g
 Heterospilus oculatus Belokobylskij, 1988 c g
 Heterospilus orientalis Belokobylskij, 1983 c g
 Heterospilus pacificola Belokobylskij & Maeto, 2008 c g
 Heterospilus pallidipes Ashmead, 1894 c g
 Heterospilus paradoxus (Enderlein, 1920) c g
 Heterospilus pectinatus (Enderlein, 1920) c
 Heterospilus pinicola Belokobylskij, 1994 c g
 Heterospilus pityophthori (Ashmead, 1893) c g
 Heterospilus prodigiosus  g
 Heterospilus prodoxi (Riley, 1880) c g
 Heterospilus pronotalis Belokobylskij, Iqbal & Austin, 2004 c g
 Heterospilus prosopidis Viereck, 1910 c g
 Heterospilus punctatus  g
 Heterospilus qingliangensis  g
 Heterospilus quaestor (Haliday, 1836) c g
 Heterospilus richardsi Marsh & Melo, 1999 c g
 Heterospilus rubicola Fischer, 1968 c g
 Heterospilus rubrocinctus (Ashmead, 1905) c g
 Heterospilus rufithorax (Cresson, 1865) c g
 Heterospilus scolyticida (Ashmead, 1893) c g
 Heterospilus selandriae (Ashmead, 1889) c g
 Heterospilus semidepressus  g
 Heterospilus separatus Fischer, 1960 c g
 Heterospilus setosiscutum  g
 Heterospilus setosus  g
 Heterospilus shawi Marsh, Wild & Whitfield, 2013 g
 Heterospilus shoshonea (Viereck, 1907) c g
 Heterospilus sicanus (Marshall, 1888) c g
 Heterospilus striatiscutum Belokobylskij & Maeto, 2008 c g
 Heterospilus striatus Muesebeck & Walkley, 1951 c g
 Heterospilus tadzhicus Belokobylskij, 1983 c g
 Heterospilus tauricus Telenga, 1941 c g
 Heterospilus tenuitergum  g
 Heterospilus terminalis Ashmead, 1900 c g
 Heterospilus testaceus (Cameron, 1905) c
 Heterospilus tirnax Papp, 1987 c g
 Heterospilus tulyensis Belokobylskij, 1994 c g
 Heterospilus variegatus Ashmead, 1894 c g
 Heterospilus vilasi (Docavo Alberti, 1960) c g
 Heterospilus watanabei Belokobylskij & Maeto, 2008 c g
 Heterospilus wuyiensis Chen & Shi, 2004 c g
 Heterospilus zaykovi van Achterberg, 1992 c g
 Heterospilus zeteki Rohwer, 1925 c g

Data sources: i = ITIS, c = Catalogue of Life, g = GBIF, b = Bugguide.net

References

Heterospilus